Lucas "Snapper" Carr is a character appearing in American comic books published by DC Comics. The character was created by writer Gardner Fox and penciller Mike Sekowsky, and first appeared in The Brave and the Bold in February 1960. From 1960 to 1969, Snapper Carr appeared as a supporting character to the Justice League of America. The character occasionally appeared in comics featuring the Justice League from 1969 to 1989, when the Invasion! limited-series comic book gave him superpowers. 

Snapper was associated with a new superhero team, The Blasters, in various comics until 1993, when he lost his powers and became a main character in the Hourman comic book, beginning in 1999. After the cancellation of Hourman in April 2001, he became a main character in the Young Justice comic book beginning in December 2001. Young Justice was cancelled in May 2003, and he became associated with the governmental organization Checkmate, a role revealed when the character played a small but important role in the 2007-2008 limited series comic book 52 Aftermath: The Four Horsemen. The character made major appearances in Final Crisis: Resist in December 2008 and Justice League of America 80-Page Giant in November 2009.

Creation and early characterization
In 1959, after the successful revival of Flash and Green Lantern, DC Comics editor Julius Schwartz decided to update the Justice Society of America using a new group of heroes under the name Justice League of America (JLA). According to Schwartz, DC Comics Executive Editor Whitney Ellsworth not only insisted that a teenager be a member of the Justice League but also that this teenager be hip. Ellsworth wanted the new superhero team to tap into the emerging and economically powerful youth culture, and specifically told Schwartz to have the character emulate the hip-talking, leather jacket-wearing, finger-snapping "Kookie" Kookson character on the popular television series 77 Sunset Strip. The teenager had to be a "civilian" (i.e., non-superhero). A hip version of an existing teenage superhero, such as Robin, Supergirl, or existing teenage "civilian" such as Jimmy Olsen was ruled out, as these characters would tend to over-emphasize the hero with whom they were already associated. To preserve the "team" nature of the new comic book, therefore, a "neutral" civilian character had to be created.

Ellsworth specifically coined the name "Snapper Carr", the character's first name indicating his habit of snapping his fingers when excited or making a point. Snapper's given name of Lucas was not revealed until 1978.

Snapper Carr made his first appearance, alongside the first appearance of the JLA, in the comic book The Brave and the Bold #28, released on December 29, 1959, but with a cover date of February–March 1960.

Snapper Carr was not intended to be a superhero, but rather a supporting character for the Justice League. Because of the critical role he played in the League's first adventure, he was formally made an "honorary member" of the JLA, and was often referred to as the team's mascot. At the end of the first adventure, Snapper received a belt with a signal device embedded in the buckle, with which he can summon members of the JLA. In keeping with his "hip" character, Justice League members later rebuilt a hot rod car so that it could fly and whisk Snapper to JLA meetings.

As written by Gardner Fox, Snapper Carr had the most distinctive personality of all the members of the Justice League. Snapper not only had the most distinctive means of speaking (with his extreme hipster slang), but he had the most clearly written and individualist character of all the recurring characters in the comic book. Within a few years, Fox got rid of the hipster slang and had Snapper speak in a more mainstream way.

Snapper's parents are identified in The Brave and the Bold #28 as Mr. and Mrs. John Carr. Two years later, readers learn in 1961 that he has a younger brother, Jimmy Carr. Snapper Carr was given a girlfriend, Midge, in Justice League of America #7 (November 1961). Snapper was also shown in 1974 to have a sister, Janet. In 1998, readers learned that Snapper had an uncle, Simon Carr, who played a major role in the founding of the Justice League. A year later, Snapper mentioned in Hourman #1 that he has a brother nicknamed "Spitter" Carr (for his habit of spitting). It is unclear if Spitter and Jimmy are the same person, or if Snapper was merely being sarcastic.

Fictional character biography

Membership in the Justice League
In The Brave and the Bold #28, the Justice League of America faces the threat of Starro, a giant alien starfish with mind-control powers. Snapper Carr, who is spreading lime on his family's lawn, is unaffected by Starro when the alien takes mental control of the population of Happy Harbor, Rhode Island. Members of the Justice League realize that Starro can be incapacitated using lime, and the alien is defeated. Comic book historian Ramzi Fawaz has argued that this adventure is a critical one in the development of the modern comic book. Not only does it mark the beginning of the superhero who identifies as a defender of the world rather than a nation, it marks the first time that a world-destroying (rather than nation-destroying) threat was depicted in comics. Snapper Carr's inclusion was also important. Whereas pre-World War II social norms had emphasized family connections as the most important relationships in a young person's life, the Justice League offered a new kind of relationship, based solely on "ethical commitments to the world", which could supplant the family. Snapper also represented a new egalitarian future, one in which youth could be accepted alongside older adults rather than patronized or excluded. For example, Snapper's first year as an honorary member of the JLA coincided with his senior year of high school. In "Man, Thy Name Is—Brother!", three League members donate their time to help Snapper write a paper about brotherhood.

In the 1985–1986 crossover Crisis on Infinite Earths, DC Comics rebooted its fictional universe and the back-stories of nearly all its characters. This required retellings of many of origin stories, including that of the Justice League of America. The first adventures of the Justice League, and that of Snapper Carr, were retold in the 12-issue maxi-series comic book JLA: Year One. The first several issues of the maxi-series involved the alien race known as the Appellaxians, which had first appeared in Justice League of America #9 (February 1962). In the fictional character chronology, this story occurs before and shortly after The Brave and the Bold #28, but in the publication history of the character it is printed in 1998. In the story, the Appellaxians conspired with a new criminal organization, Locus, to take over Earth. Snapper's uncle, Simon Carr, made his first appearance in the second issue, and in the third issue readers learned that Simon is the contact person for an ultra-wealthy individual (later revealed to be Oliver Queen) who wishes to financially support the Justice League in its mission. Simon introduced the League to college student and genius inventor Ted Kord (who would become the superhero Blue Beetle), who provided them with some technology, and to his nephew, Snapper. The adventure with Starro took place between JLA: Year One issues #3 and #4, and Snapper played a critical role in issue #9 in alerting the League to the Appellaxian attack on Earth. In issue #10, he deduced that his uncle had been possessed by the Appellaxian leader, and had the League defeat Simon and then free him from alien control.

Another Snapper Carr story appeared in 2001, but in the fictional character chronology, the story occurred some time during his honorary membership in the Justice League. This time, Snapper assists the Atom in building equipment and running software programs to fight the villain Chronos.

Betrayal of the JLA
Gardner Fox left Justice League of America with issue #65, and Dennis O'Neil took over scripting duties. By this time, the Snapper Carr character was immensely unpopular. O'Neil felt Snapper was outdated and no longer fit with the Justice League. He considered two options: Letting the character disappear without explanation, or writing the character out of the book. O'Neil decided on the latter, even if it seemed abrupt.

By the time the story "Snapper Carr—Super Traitor!" appeared, the Snapper Carr character had not been present in any Justice League of America stories for some time. The story begins with Snapper shown to be upset by the fact that people are interested in him only because of what he knows about the Justice League, and not because he is a hero in his own right. He is confronted by John Dough, "the most average man in America", who wants to rid the world of superheroes. Snapper helps Dough kidnap Batman, and addresses a public rally condemning superheroes. The crowd riots, and the Justice League members (except for new member Black Canary) lose control of their powers. After a fake Batman attacks people attending a congressional hearing into causes of the riot, Snapper resigns his honorary membership in the Justice League. When the League returns to its Secret Sanctuary (located in a seaside cave near Happy Harbor), they're attacked by Dough—who turns out to be the Joker. Joker reveals that Snapper told "John Dough" the location of the League's Secret Sanctuary. The League captures the Joker, but Snapper has departed.

Although the Secret Sanctuary had been compromised seven times before, the JLA now decided to abandon its "Secret Sanctuary" and build a new headquarters, the Justice League Satellite. It occupied this orbital hideout in February 1970.

"Snapper Carr—Super Traitor!" was the last Joker story for four years, and the last time the Silver Age Joker was seen in print. A much darker, more Gothic Joker later appeared in Batman #251, and is the first appearance of the modern Joker. This story also arguably marked the end of the Silver Age version of the Justice League of America as well. Although Snapper Carr was, in later comic book appearances, shown to have made money by writing a memoir about his time with the League, he was also depicted as feeling immense shame for having been tricked by the Joker into betraying the team.

Role in the Justice League
Snapper's role in the Justice League was a varied one. In many early adventures, he often (and unintentionally) provided information or scientific clues which enabled the League to solve mysteries or defeat enemies. For example, in the team's third published adventure, "Case of the Stolen Super Powers!", several important zoo specimens have gone missing. Snapper mentions a few facts about long-lived creatures that he's incorporating into a term paper. Members of the JLA realize that the missing animals were all long-lived. This enables them to deduce the plans of Professor Ivo (who is trying to create an immortality serum) and defeat his android, Amazo.

Usually, Snapper was depicted on "monitor duty", using the JLA computers and satellites to monitor national and world events for trouble to which the heroes could respond. Later, he was depicted as being a journalist, reporting on the League's activities and providing the "official" record of their exploits, as well as overseeing the JLA's mail handling and processing and responding to fans and admirers. Throughout the comic book series JLA: Year One, Snapper was also depicted as a mechanic and I.T. worker, overseeing the installation of a great deal of technology in the Secret Sanctuary and maintaining the hideout's machinery.

Post-JLA
In the character's fictional biography, Snapper Carr made a number of appearances between 1969 and 1989.

His first appearance came in 1972 100th issue, a story in which the JLA has a celebration. Snapper is invited to attend, but is too ashamed by his betrayal of the League to do so.

His second appearance came in 1974, when Justice League of America writer Len Wein decided to have Snapper and his family get kidnapped by a mentally ill man calling himself Anakronus. Anakronus claims to be a supervillain who has attacked the Justice League numerous times, but Snapper knows that the man has never tangled with the League before. Snapper succeeds in having Anakronus tell his (rather lengthy) stories about how he destroyed the League. This prevents the man from killing the Carr family for several hours. Members of the JLA show up and easily apprehend Anakronus.

The Star-Tsar
The Snapper Carr character was depicted as a supervillain in 1977.

The Key was a villain who had brainwashed Snapper in 1965, and induced him to poison the JLA's food. In 1968, the Key implanted a post-hypnotic suggestion in the members of the JLA, which forced them to stay in their headquarters for one hour. At the end of that time, they would kill one another. The Key planned for Snapper to kill Superman with a kryptonite ray-gun. The Key battled the Justice League again in 1974, attempting to blow up the city of St. Louis, Missouri, but Snapper Carr was not present for this event (having resigned from the JLA five years earlier).

The Key's 1977 involvement with Snapper Carr came in the story "The Face of the Star-Tsar!" Doctor Light, a long-time JLA foe, attempted to access the JLA Satellite. Mark Shaw, the former villainous Manhunter now in a new guise as the heroic Privateer, tried to stop him but was defeated. The JLA arrived and Light fled, only to run into a new villain—the Star-Tsar. When the JLA caught up to the two villains, the Star-Tsar fled to the city of Washington, D.C., and attacked an embassy there. The JLA rushed to the nation's capital and apprehended the Star-Tsar's henchmen, but they could not locate the villain himself. They did, however, find Snapper Carr lurking nearby. The JLA then rushed off to Doctor Light's underwater lair in a lake in New York City's Central Park. Anticipating their arrival, Doctor Light trapped the heroes with a device that phased them out of our dimension. In a surprising turn of events, the Star-Tsar helped the Justice League escape before fleeing himself. Trapped in his own hideout by the JLA, Doctor Light blew a hole in the wall and escaped again. Leaving the villain's lair, the JLA discovered the unconscious Star-Tsar, who had been knocked out by debris from the blast. They unmasked him, only to discover that the Star-Tsar was Snapper Carr.

The story continued in "The Key—Or Not The Key", with Snapper/Star-Tsar freed by Star-Tsar henchmen. Several League members trace the henchmen's flying getaway vehicles to the Star-Tsar's lair. They are swiftly captured by the Key, who survived his last encounter with the Justice League back in 1974. Meanwhile, in Happy Harbor, other JLA members try to talk to Snapper Carr's family in an attempt to understand why Snapper would have turned to crime. Janet Carr bitterly tells the heroes that Snapper was unable to attend college or find employment because of his past association with the Justice League, and had been living a life of misery and poverty. As Janet spoke to them, the Star-Tsar attacked Happy Harbor. But after seeing Janet, he broke off his attack and fled. The JLA members followed the Star-Tsar to the Key's hideout, but Snapper—dressed as the Star-Tsar—tried to warn them that they were falling into a trap. A second Star-Tsar appeared and incapacitated everyone. Later, this second Star-Tsar set off bombs in Washington, D.C., and threatened President Jimmy Carter with more explosions if he did not pay a ransom. In the Key's hideout, Snapper found himself imprisoned alongside the other JLAers. He told them how the Key found him, destitute and depressed, and offered to supply him with weapons and money if he attacked the JLA. Desperate to feel good about himself, Snapper agreed to participate in the Key's plan. Snapper said the Key, disguised as the Star-Tsar, must have attacked the embassy in Washington. Feeling remorse for attacking his friends, Snapper decided to expose the Key by attacking Happy Harbor (knowing full well that the JLA would easily track him). The JLA soon freed themselves, and discovered that the Key had suffered a horrible accident that left him with a doll-sized body but normal-sized head. The heroes deduced that since the Key could not run in his robotic, humanoid body, there must be a third Star-Tsar. The Red Tornado then exposed Mark Shaw as the third Star-Tsar. At the end of the story, Superman says he will not send Snapper Carr to jail, and has something else in mind for him.

Post-Star-Tsar
The Snapper Carr character made a number of appearances in The Superman Family comic book from 1978 to 1982. Superman gets Snapper at job at S.T.A.R. Labs, the fictional nonprofit research corporation devoted to creating high-tech weapons and prisons to handle various supervillain and alien menaces. Snapper surreptitiously stole the wreck of a Kryptonian space-sled in the story "Birthright of Power!", and briefly appeared in the story "Kandor vs. Supergirl" as a witness at the trial of Supergirl. He helped defend her in the follow-on story by gathering letters of recommendation from Justice League members, and then was hired as an assistant by Supergirl's foster father, Fred Danvers. Three issues later, he made a brief appearance in the Supergirl story "What Goes Up Can't Come Down" and its conclusion "The Gravity War". At the end of "Nightmare in New Athens", Snapper is shown to have used the space-sled to fix a Superboy robot, but a disembodied intelligence takes control of the android. In "The Screamin' Demon", readers learn that student teacher Paul French has tried to wipe the memories of his criminal past by developing a "transistorized brain". Somehow, it all went wrong, and while he slept his unconscious mind seized control of the robot (Supergirl briefly battled the robot before Paul woke).

The Snapper Carr character also played a role in the resignation of Green Arrow from the JLA. The story, which is told in flashback, depicted Black Canary and Green Arrow investigating an explosion at the Star City Museum. They were attacked by the Star-Tsar, felled, and hospitalized. Snapper Carr, who just happened to be in Star City, arrives at the hospital to tell them that his Star-Tsar suit was stolen from the Metropolis police by an astronomer named Richard Rigel, who was working on technology powered by starlight. Green Arrow manages to stop the new Star-Tsar by deducing where he will attack next, but not before members of the JLA almost allow the villain to kill thousands of people. In annoyed at the JLA's conduct, Green Arrow resigned from the Justice League.

Writer Gerry Conway brought Snapper Carr back to the Justice League for the comic book's 200th issue. A post-hypnotic suggestion makes the League's original seven members try to reassemble the seven Appellaxian meteorites from the 1962 adventure and use them to clone new Appellaxians who will initiate a second invasion of Earth. Snapper Carr waits with superhero Firestorm aboard the JLA Satellite, while the other heroes successfully battle the aliens.

The Snapper Carr character appeared again in 1999 in the comic book Legends of the DC Universe. In the fictional character chronology, this story occurs some time after Green Arrow's 1980 resignation from the Justice League, but before Green Arrow rejoins the League in 1982. In this story ("Critical Mass Stages 1-5"/"Critical Mass Stages 6-16"), Snapper witnesses five JLA members growing to monstrous size. He believes this is a side-effect of a long-ago attack by a minor villain named Packrat. Snapper finds Green Arrow, who locates Packrat's shrink ray and restores the heroes to their correct size. As Snapper departs, Green Arrow tells the boy that he needs to forgive himself.

The Blasters
In 1989, DC Comics published a three-issue limited series titled Invasion! The Dominators, an alien race usually seen in the Legion of Super-Heroes comics, decide to invade Earth to learn the secret of the metagene—a gene that can give certain human beings superpowers. In the first issue of Invasion!, it is revealed that thousands of Earthlings have been kidnapped and taken to the Dominator homeworld, where they are forced to run a gauntlet of horrific, deadly traps and experiments known as "the Blaster". Six humans, including Snapper Carr, survive the Blaster, an indication that they have the metagene. Indeed, the Blaster itself forces the metagene in each person to manifest, and Snapper gains the ability to teleport whenever he snaps his fingers. In the third issue, these six new heroes are transferred to Starlag, the Dominator prison-world. There, they meet up with the extraterrestrial superhero team the Omega Men. They also meet Brainiac 2 and his super-team, the Licensed Extra-Governmental Interstellar Operatives Network (L.E.G.I.O.N.). Together, the three groups break out of Starlag and flee aboard a shuttle piloted by the feline alien, Churljenkins. They run into a superhero task force led by Superman, and assist in the invasion of the Dominator homeworld. There, they discover a cure for the Dominators' "gene bomb" (a device which accelerates metagene activity and destabilizes superpowers, ending with the death of the person with the metagene). Snapper and his group, now called the Blasters, return to Earth while Churljenkins joins the Omega Men and flies off into space.

The Snapper Carr character next appeared in a one-shot comic, Blasters. The story in this comic book begins with Snapper Carr in an alien insane asylum. Snapper had decided to keep his eyes open during a teleport, to see what occurs. On his dismay, he witnessed an eternity of time passing, and was driven temporarily insane. The reader also learns that each of the Blasters has had trouble adjusting to their new superpowers, and are also incarcerated in the asylum. Snapper escapes by teleporting directly to Churljenkins' ship, which had broken down on an alien world. Churljenkins restores Snapper's sanity, and the two of them repair the ship and flee—stranding the Omega Men. They learn that the Dominators have destroyed Churljenkins' home planet, so they return to Earth. On the journey there, they discover that the Spider Guild (an alien race of humanoid arachnids) has created a weapons depot near Earth. Snapper breaks the Blasters out of the hospital, and the team destroys the depot.

Valor and the loss of Snapper's hands
The Snapper Carr character next appeared in the comic book Valor. The planet Daxam had helped the Dominators invade Earth, but were convinced by Superman to switch sides. Daxamites, a sub-species of Kryptonian, also gain superpowers under a yellow sun, and this vast army of supermen helped turn the tide and save Earth. The father of Lar Gand (later named Mon-el) died during this battle. Deciding to honor his father, Lar Gand becomes a superhero, joins L.E.G.I.O.N., and meets Superman—who gives him the name Valor. Snapper Carr's involvement in the Valor story begins after Valor is accidentally imprisoned on Starlag II, a Dominator prison-world with a red sun. Valor signals for help, and his artificial intelligence unit sends for the Blasters. By this time, the Blasters had a number of adventures (none of them depicted in the comic book, just mentioned by the characters) which had turned out poorly, and were about to disband. While rescuing Valor, the team accidentally releases the energy being known as The Unimaginable. Valor and the Blasters battle The Unimaginable, and Valor escapes Starlag II. The Blasters, however, become trapped there.

Some time thereafter, Snapper Carr and the Blasters are able to escape Starlag II, but Snapper becomes separated from his friends (their escape, and how Snapper became separated from them, is not depicted in any comic). In stories first published in 2000, but occurring in the character's chronology at a point after the adventure with Valor, Snapper finds himself being pursued by the Khunds, an aggressive alien race from the Legion of Super-Heroes comic books. Snapper is captured, and his fingers are locked together to prevent him from teleporting. Snapper mulls over his past, and concludes that he has always been a disappointment—first to the Justice League, then to the Blasters. The Khunds torture Snapper, then cut off his hands—depriving him of the ability to teleport (Snapper Carr later tells Hourman that this is the worst moment in his life). At some point soon thereafter, Snapper Carr is reunited with Brainiac 2 on the planet Cairn, where Brainiac gives him new hands, but Snapper still cannot teleport.

Hourman
The character of Snapper Carr is a main character in the Hourman comic book, which was published from April 1999 to April 2001. Throughout the comic book's run, a running gag depicts Snapper wearing a series of T-shirts, each emblazoned with a different superhero's logo or uniform colors. In this comic book, Hourman III is an android from the 853rd century. He was built by Tyler ChemoRobotics, a company founded by Hourman II (Rick Tyler) in the late 20th century. Hourman III traveled permanently to the 20th century, which is the one place he believed he could grow and evolve as a lifeform. He joined the Justice League, and at one point accessed all of Batman's memories of the League. These memories made Hourman III realize that Snapper Carr would be a good "humanity coach". The reader learns that, after having his hands restored, Snapper returned to Earth. He married and was divorced by a young woman named Bethany Lee (whose mother is the Happy Harbor chief of police). Snapper is depicted spending most of his time at a trendy if run-down Happy Harbor coffeehouse, the Mad Yak Café, and caring for his pet cat, whom he has named Starro.

Throughout the run of Hourman, Snapper is subjected to a wide range of horrors and bad experiences.  Snapper is turned into an android by Amazo after Amazo gains the ability to not just capture a person's super-powers but their humanity as well. Starro is injured, and Hourman reverses the "humanization" effect. In a tie-in to the "Day of Judgment" cross-over and one-off, Snapper fantasizes about two alternative futures—one in which he never betrays the Justice League and becomes a super-hero, and one in which he betrays them and becomes a washed-up alcoholic. Snapper is able to deduce that demons are harassing him and his friends, causing these fantasies, and he not only gets rid of the demons but convinces one of them to reject evil and become good by (feeding it cheesecake). Shortly thereafter, Snapper Carr and his friends are accidentally trapped aboard Hourman's timeship for months, nearly going insane. After being freed, Snapper is kidnapped by demons and tortured for several days, but is freed by Hourman. Snapper is shown suffering from severe depression after this experience. Hourman asks Snapper to tell him about his time with the Justice League, and in flashback Snapper relates the events of Justice League of America #77. The reader learns that Snapper regrets quitting the Justice League, and that Bethany divorced him because Snapper felt he wasn't good enough for her. Hourman says that Snapper fights for the common man, and that's what people like about him. This lifts Snapper out of his depression. Amazo returns and appears to kill Snapper Carr. The reader learns, however, that Snapper is not dead but back in time, caught in a loop where he is forced to relive the loss of his hands over and over. Hourman merges his body with Amazo's, and is able to retrieve Snapper from the time-loop. Realizing he's learned as much about being human as he can, Hourman decides to return to the 853rd century. He takes Snapper and his other friends aboard the timeship for some travel and fun, but Hourman suddenly vanishes from the craft and it crashes on an asteroid. After a few days pass, Hourman returns to the timeship, drops Snapper and his friends off at Happy Harbor, and leaves.

Young Justice
The character of Snapper Carr has a major recurring role in the comic book Young Justice. The T-shirt running gag begun in Hourman continues in Young Justice.

Young Justice is a group of superheroes composed of teenagers and young adults. Initially, the group was mentored by the Red Tornado, but in Young Justice #38, the super-fast hero known as Impulse (Bart Allen) decides to leave the group to live a life away from super-heroics. Robin (Tim Drake) resigns, too, feeling no one trusts him. Wonder Girl (Cassie Sandsmark) asks Red Tornado for help, and he persuades Snapper Carr to provide daily oversight of the group. Snapper Carr appears irregularly over the remaining publication history of Young Justice. He appeared in issues #39, #40, and #41, but not in issues #42, #43, #44, or #45. Snapper reappeared in issues #46 and #47, but wasn't in issue #48. He returned in issue #49, did not appear in issue #50, and returned again in issue #51. Snapper Carr appeared in the remaining issues of Young Justice, which ended its publication run with issue #55.

During and after Snapper Carr's run in Young Justice, the character appeared in cameos three times in other comic books. The first appearance was when he attended Green Arrow's funeral. The second appearance showed him hanging out with the Justice League during a meeting with the Avengers from Marvel Comics. The third appearance was when he attended Green Arrow's wedding to Black Canary. In this last outing, Snapper's invitation to the wedding is stolen and restolen by a host of villains, but Snapper manages to attend the event all the same.

Checkmate
DC Comics rebooted their comic universe in 1985 and 1986 in the crossover event Crisis on Infinite Earths, again in Zero Hour: Crisis in Time in 1994, then in Infinite Crisis in 2005 and 2006, in Final Crisis in 2008, in Flashpoint and "The New 52" in 2011. The initial reboot was intended to resolve continuity problems which had crept into the DC Comics universe over the past 50 years, and the subsequent reboots were to correct problems created by Crisis on Infinite Earths.

During the build-up to Infinite Crisis, DC Comics published a limited series titled Identity Crisis. Batman is surprised to discover that many supervillains have gained access to the JLA Satellite, the Justice League Watchtower (a base on the moon), and (after the Watchtower's destruction) the new JLA Satellite. Worse, many villains have learned the secret identity of a wide range of heroes. Zatanna, a sorceress and Justice League member, has (with the consent of nearly all members of the League) been wiping the memories of these villains. Batman, who opposed this decision, also had his memories wiped. In May 2005, comic book readers learn that Batman has designed and constructed an artificial intelligence and placed it aboard a satellite called Brother MK I, nicknamed "Brother Eye". The purpose of Brother Eye is to keep track of superhero activities in case Batman's memories are wiped again. The hero-turned-villain Alexander Luthor, Jr. gives the satellite sentience and Maxwell Lord, leader of the government agency Checkmate, takes control of it. Lord secretly alters millions of people around the globe with Checkmate technology, turning them into "Observational Metahuman Activity Constructs" (OMACs)—superpowered creatures which will do Lord's bidding. Brother Eye frames Wonder Woman for Lord's death and then unleashes a quarter million OMACs against the world's heroes. Brother Eye is eventually defeated, although hundreds of thousands of people still have OMAC technology within their bodies.

It is later revealed the Snapper Carr joined Checkmate during the OMAC crisis.

The Infinite Crisis crossover event that concluded in 2006 was immediately followed by a major DC Comics event known as One Year Later. One Year Later was designed to explore the major continuity changes created by Infinite Crisis. With Superman and Batman apparently dead and Wonder Woman retired, One Year Later also examined how the world coped without its three biggest superheroes. It was followed chronologically by 52, a one-comic-a-week publication that covered the "missing year" between the end of Infinite Crisis and One Year Later. In the fictional timeline of the DC Comics universe, 52 came between Infinite Crisis and One Year Later.

52 included several one-off and limited series comic books.  One of these limited series was the six-part comic book 52: Aftermath. 52 had established the existence of the Science Squad, a group of supervillain mad scientists based in the nation of Oolong Island (which is ruled by evil superscientist Veronica Cale). The Science Squad unleashes the Four Horsemen of Apokolips—Yurrd (famine), Rogga (war), Zorrm (pestilence), and Azraeuz (death). These bioengineered beings were created specifically to attack the Black Marvel Family, rulers of the Middle Eastern nation of Kahndaq. In 52 #43 through #50 and expanded upon in the four issues of the limited series World War III, Black Adam's lover, the superheroine Isis, dies after being infected by Zorrm, and Yurrd eats her brother, Osiris. Black Adam goes mad with rage and grief and announces he will kill every single human being on the planet. He then commits genocide, murdering all the people in the fictional Middle Eastern nation of Bialya (where he believes the Four Horsemen originated). After being briefly imprisoned by the Science Squad, Black Adam is freed by his friend Atom Smasher (who mistakenly doesn't believe Black Adam capable of genocide) and slaughters hundreds of thousands of people in Italy and China. Black Adam is finally stopped by Captain Marvel.

The Four Horsemen are not dead, however. They return almost immediately in a new limited series comic book, 52 Aftermath: The Four Horsemen, which began publication in November 2007 (six months after the events of 52 and World War III). In this story, the spirits of the bioengineered beings survived their destruction by Black Adam and fled to the former nation of Bialya, where millions of bodies lay unburied. Veronica Cale (hoping to regain control of the beings) secretly gives them "morphogenetic technology" to make their bodies more adaptable to Earth and less capable of being destroyed. Superman, Batman, and Wonder Woman arrive in Bialya in time to see the Four Horsemen constructing new bodies from the millions of corpses lying around them. The Snapper Carr character appears at the end of the second issue, where he is shown monitoring the three heroes for Checkmate. Snapper reveals himself to the heroes in the third issue, and explains that he not only joined Checkmate during the OMAC crisis but has been secretly monitoring the Justice League's activities since the dissolution of Young Justice. Superman is angered by this and demands an end to Snapper's spying, but Batman argues that Snapper can help in case the battle against the Four Horsemen does not go well. Things don't go well, and Superman rescues Batman and Snapper from an advancing army of zombies resurrected by Azraeuz. Superman is infected by Zorrm, and Batman voices concern for him. Snapper Carr blithely tells him that "Clark can take care of himself", and Batman slaps him for pretending an over-friendly familiarity with a hero he barely knows. In the fourth issue of the limited series, Mister Terrific, one of the four heads of Checkmate, arrives on Oolong Island. He teleports Snapper, Superman, and Batman out of Bialya and to Oolong Island, where he tells the heroes that the Science Squad is alarmed that the Four Horsemen remain out of their control. The villains, he says, are now attempting to build a device to contain them, and Checkmate is assisting that effort. Snapper is present when Batman, Superman, and Wonder Woman defeat the Four Horsemen, and is left behind on the island by the heroes when they leave.

Final Crisis: Resist
From 2007 to 2008, DC Comics published the Death of the New Gods eight-issue limited series. In this comic book, all of the New Gods are killed, the planets New Genesis and Apokolips merge, and the Fourth World dimension ceases to exist in favor of a new "Fifth World" dimension.

In May 2007, even as 52 was still being published, DC Comics began publishing the 52-issue, one-comic-per-week Countdown comic book (later known as Countdown to Final Crisis). It premiered with issue #51 (issues were numbered in reverse order), changed its name to Countdown to Final Crisis midway through its publication run, and concluded with DC Universe #0 (also known as Countdown to Final Crisis #0). This set in motion yet another reboot of the DC Comics universe, Final Crisis. There was a seven-issue Final Crisis limited series, six crossover stories, a one-off, and 10 Final Crisis spin-off titles (some of them one-shots, some of them limited series).

The Final Crisis event storyline begins with Darkseid's death, and his spirit and the spirit of all the Apokoliptian New Gods falling to Earth. This somehow creates a quantum singularity that will consume all creation. The supervillain Libra, who became a New God after his 1974 battle with the Justice League and somehow escaped the death of the New Gods, seizes control of a large number of nations and organizations on Earth on behalf of Darkseid. Darkseid obtains a new body, and releases the Anti-Life Equation (a metaphysical virus which allows Darkseid to control the mind of anyone it infects). After a month, nearly all the people of Earth are under Darkseid's control. So are most superheroes and supervillains, whom Darkseid organizes into a terrorist unit called "Justifiers". Darkseid is eventually defeated, and the universe rebooted by Superman (using a Miracle Machine from the 31st century).

The one-off publication Final Crisis: Resist features Snapper Carr. It begins the same day the Anti-Life Equation is released, and the events in the story take place over the next few days. In the book's opening pages, Snapper is shown to be at Checkmate's headquarters in Antarctica. While nearly all Checkmate staff, heroes, and villains are infected with Anti-Life, a few barricade themselves inside the compound, which is protected by force fields. Snapper, whose teleportation abilities have now remanifested (how is not explained in the story), spends the first few days after the release of Anti-Life teleporting around the globe disrupting Darkseid's hold on various scientific organizations. But supplies are almost nonexistent at the Checkmate base. After several days, Snapper teleports to France to seek food for the Checkmate hold-outs. He is attacked by the Anti-Life-infected hero Firehawk, but the supervillain Cheetah knocks Firehawk unconscious. A few days later, Snapper teleports to a hospital in the United States to find medical supplies. He is sickened to see children being infected with Anti-Life. He discovers Cheetah in an empty medical ward of the hospital, bandaging an injury. Cheetah reacts to Snapper's presence by seducing him, and they make love. Cheetah tells Snapper she is impressed by his physical endowment and love-making skills. Their post-coital interlude is interrupted by the Justifier Gorilla Grodd. Snapper teleports himself and Cheetah to Checkmate headquarters, but the strain of teleporting another person (which he is doing for the first time) burns out his teleportation power. The one-off comic book ends with Mister Terrific activating OMACs worldwide to help defeat Darkseid. The final panels of the publication show Snapper leading a charge of OMACs, Mister Terrific, Cheetah, and the remaining Checkmate staff in a charge out of the bunker.

Battle against Epoch
The next appearance of the Snapper Carr character occurred in 2009 in Justice League of America 80-Page Giant.

In this story, Snapper Carr is biding his time at the Secret Sanctuary in Happy Harbor, and summons Cheetah for some romance and perhaps sex. Their tryst is interrupted by the appearance of the supervillain known as Time Commander (who had recently battled Hourman II). Time Commander claims that his grandmother is about to be born today, and that the supervillain Epoch (formerly known as the Lord of Time, and an old JLA enemy) wants to kill the infant so that Time Commander will never be born. Epoch, he says, is already in the hospital and searching for the child. Furthermore, Epoch is also trying to kill the Justice League by attacking them when they were children. Time Commander has already scattered the JLA through time in an attempt to stop Epoch from carrying out his plans (if the Justice League never survives infancy, they will not form the League and Snapper Carr will not be around to help Time Commander). Most of the issue follows the adventures of six teams, composed of one or more League members, as they try to stop Epoch at various points in the past. At the end of the issue, Snapper persuades Cheetah to help by distracting Epoch so Snapper can teleport into the hospital, grab Epoch, and then teleport himself and Epoch back outside. Having done so, Snapper then grabs Epoch's "time gauntlet" and teleports to the side of the Time Commander—with Epoch's forearm and hand in his grasp (the re-emergence of Snapper's teleportation powers is not explained in the story). With Epoch's technology (and limb) stolen, the attack in the past ceases. The JLA reappear and quickly subdue Epoch. Cheetah, Snapper, and Time Commander bid goodbye to the newborn grandmother in the hospital, and Time Commander takes Epoch to the Timepoint (a frozen moment in time that serves as a prison). In the story's final panels, Cheetah reveals that the baby isn't Time Commander's grandmother (a fact she can sense using her fertility powers). Snapper realizes he's been duped: The Time Commander merely wanted to distract Snapper so that he could steal Hourman's hourglass-shaped time-travel device from the JLA trophy case.

Dial H for Hero
Snapper Carr makes an appearance in the 2019 run of Dial H for Hero. The H-Dial (which can turn a person into a wide range of super-powered beings) is found by Miguel Montez. The H-Dial proves to be addictive, so that anyone who has used it in the past now craves to possess and use it. The mysterious villain Mister Thunderbolt is one of these seeking the device. Miguel and his friend, Summer Pickens, arrive at the Justice League's Detroit headquarters and meet Snapper Carr, who is managing robotic doubles of the Justice League. As Snapper Carr tries to contact the Hall of Justice, Mister Thunderbolt programs the robots to attack Miguel, Summer, and Snapper. Using the H-Dial, Summer transforms into Chimp Change, Snapper turns into Alien Ice Cream Man, and Miguel turns into Lil' Miguelito. As Chimp Change and Alien Ice Cream Man subdue the robots, Mister Thunderbolt tricks Miguel into dialing "S" for Sockamagee. This releases Mister Thunderbolt from his prison. Summer and Snapper return to normal. Mister Thunderbolt disappears into a dimensional portal, and Miguel follows him. With Snapper still unable to contact the Hall of Justice, Summer borrows the Supermobile and flies to Metropolis to find Superman.

Alternate versions
 Snapper Carr appeared, using his given name of Lucas, in the Elseworlds one-shot JLA: The Island of Doctor Moreau.
 Snapper Carr appeared as a talk show host in the Elseworlds one-shot Son of Superman.
 An image of Snapper Carr appears in second volume of the comic book Young Justice. This comic, which ties into the Young Justice television series, has Superboy sensing an intruder in the Secret Sanctuary. The intruder turns out to be a young Snapper Carr. Both Superboy and Snapper are knocked out by the Joker, who has tricked Snapper into revealing the location of the Justice League's headquarters. However, Superboy eventually realizes that Snapper and the Joker are merely hallucinations generated by a genomorph creature which has escaped from Project Cadmus. The creature relied on genetic memories Superboy had of Superman's experiences with the Justice League.

In other media

Television
 Snapper Carr is a recurring character in the DC Animated Universe (DCAU) series Justice League, voiced by Jason Marsden. This version is a young television reporter who comments on events in the episodes. Additionally, a character similar to him called Ray Thompson appears in the episode "Legends", voiced by Neil Patrick Harris. He is the sidekick of the Justice Guild in another dimension, who gained reality-warping powers from radiation after a nuclear war destroyed most of his Earth. He used these powers to recreate the Earth as it was before the war, but was ultimately defeated by the Justice League.
 Lucas Carr is a recurring character in Young Justice, voiced by Greg Weisman. This version is a history teacher and later principal at Happy Harbor High, who in season 4 marries Bethany Lee and adopts Harper Row and her brother Cullen. He also officiates Superboy and Miss Martian's wedding in the series finale. 
 A much older and more cantankerous version of Snapper Carr appears in Supergirl, portrayed by Ian Gomez. He appears as the new editor-in-chief at CatCo Magazine, and clashes with Kara Danvers over her reporting skills.

References
Notes

Citations

Bibliography

External links
 Snapper Carr bio at the Unofficial Guide to the DC Universe

Comics characters introduced in 1960
DC Comics sidekicks
DC Comics characters who can teleport
DC Comics male characters
DC Comics metahumans
Fictional characters from Rhode Island
Fictional secret agents and spies
Characters created by Gardner Fox
Characters created by Mike Sekowsky
Fictional reporters
Fictional writers